HMS Boyne was a Hawthorn Leslie type River-class destroyer ordered by the Royal Navy under the 1903 – 1904 Naval Estimates.  Named after the River Boyne in Ireland, the site of a British military victory in 1689, she was the fifth ship to carry this name since it was introduced in 1692 for a two deck ship-of-the-line.

Construction
She was laid down on 16 June 1903 at the Hawthorn Leslie shipyard at Hebburn-on-Tyne and launched on 12 September 1904.  She was completed on 1 May 1905.  Her original armament was to be the same as the turtleback torpedo boat destroyers that preceded her.  In 1906 the Admiralty decided to upgrade the armament by landing the five 6-pounder naval guns and shipping three 12-pounder 8 hundredweight guns.  Two would be mounted abeam at the foc'sle break and the third gun would be mounted on the quarterdeck.

Pre-war
After commissioning she was assigned to the East Coast Destroyer Flotilla of the 1st Fleet and based at Harwich.

In 1906 Boyne, still part of the First Destroyer Division, had defects repaired at Portsmouth Dockyard. On 27 April 1908 the Eastern Flotilla departed Harwich for live fire and night manoeuvres.  During these exercises HMS Attentive rammed and sank HMS Gala then damaged HMS Ribble.

In April 1909 she was assigned to the 3rd Destroyer Flotilla on its formation at Harwich.  She remained until displaced by a Basilisk-class destroyer by May 1912.  She was assigned to the 5th Destroyer Flotilla of the 2nd Fleet with a nucleus crew.

On 30 August 1912 the Admiralty directed all destroyer classes were to be designated by alpha characters starting with the letter 'A'.  The ships of the River class were assigned to the E class.  After 30 September 1913, she was known as an E-class destroyer and had the letter ‘E’ painted on the hull below the bridge area and on either the fore or aft funnel.

World War I
In early 1914 when displaced by G-class destroyers she joined the 9th Destroyer Flotilla based at Chatham tendered to HMS St George. The 9th Flotilla was a patrol flotilla tasked with anti-submarine and counter-mining patrols in the Firth of Forth area. Here she provided anti-submarine and counter mining patrols in defence of the main fleet anchorage.

In August 1915 with the amalgamation of the 9th and 7th Flotillas she was deployed to the 7th Destroyer Flotilla based at the River Humber.  She remained employed on the Humber patrol participating in counter-mining operations and anti-submarine patrols for the remainder of the war.

Disposal
In 1919 she was laid up in reserve awaiting disposal.  On 30 August 1919 she was sold to Hayes of Porthcawl for breaking.

Pennant numbers

References

Bibliography

 

River-class destroyers
Ships built on the River Tyne
1904 ships